This is a list of the main career statistics of professional Kazakhstani tennis player Elena Rybakina. She has won four WTA singles titles, and finished runner-up in eight more finals. She achieved her biggest result at the 2022 Wimbledon Championships, where she won the women's singles trophy, becoming the first Kazakhstani player to win a Grand Slam tournament. She has twelve top–10 wins, including victories over the current and former No. 1 players Iga Świątek, Simona Halep, Karolína Plíšková, Garbiñe Muguruza, and Serena Williams. She entered the top 20 for the first time in February 2020, and on 20 March 2023, she achieved her highest ranking of world No. 7.

Performance timelines

Only main-draw results in WTA Tour, Grand Slam tournaments, Fed Cup/Billie Jean King Cup and Olympic Games are included in win–loss records.

Singles
Current through the 2023 Indian Wells Open.

Doubles
Current after the 2023 Australian Open.

Mixed doubles

Note: Rybakina played under Russian flag until 2018

Significant finals

Grand Slam tournament finals

Singles: 2 (1 title, 1 runner-up)

Olympic finals

Singles: 1 (4th place)

WTA 1000 finals

Singles: 1 (1 title)

Doubles: 1 (runner-up)

WTA career finals

Singles: 12 (4 titles, 8 runner-ups)

Doubles: 2 (2 runner-ups)

ITF Circuit finals

Singles: 9 (4 titles, 5 runner–ups)

Doubles: 4 (4 titles)

ITF Junior Circuit finals

Singles: 9 (6 titles, 3 runner-ups)

Doubles: 8 (3 titles, 5 runner-ups)

Note: Tournaments sourced from official Junior ITF archives

WTA ranking 
During the years, Rybakina rose in the rankings. She made big progress in 2019, when debuted in the top 100 and later entered the top 50. In 2020, she continued with improvement, getting to the place of 17 as her career-highest singles ranking.

WTA Tour career earnings 
Current after the 2022 Wimbledon

Career Grand Slam statistics

Seedings
The tournaments won by Rybakina are in boldface, and advanced into finals by Rybakina are in italics.

Best Grand Slam results details 
Tournament winners are in boldface, and runners-up are in italics.

Record against other players

No. 1 wins

Record against top 10 players 

 She has a 12–14 record against players who were, at the time the match was played, ranked in the top 10.

Notes

References

Rybakina, Elena